State Route 60 (SR 60) is a north–south state highway that runs the entire length of the U.S. state of Ohio, from the Williamstown Bridge over the Ohio River in Marietta to U.S. Route 6 (US 6) near Lake Erie in Vermilion. It is the seventh longest state route in Ohio.

Heading south from Vermilion, SR 60 traverses rural North Central Ohio while connecting Vermilion, New London, Ashland, and Loudonville.  South of Loudonville, SR 60 enters more hilly country, before entering the Muskingum River Valley at Dresden. It closely parallels the Muskingum River for the remainder of its journey to Marietta except for an  stretch in Morgan County where it moves inland to avoid bends in the river.

Markers for SR 60 are not posted south of the Greene Street/3rd Street intersection in Marietta, the location of SR 26's southern terminus. SR 60 is unsigned along SR 7 / SR 26 / Greene Street and the Williamstown Bridge approach.

History
Parts of SR 60 were once signed as SR 77. In order to eliminate a numerical duplication with an Interstate highway in Ohio having the same number, Interstate 77, SR 77 was renumbered in part as SR 60.

Major junctions

References

External links

060
Transportation in Washington County, Ohio
Transportation in Morgan County, Ohio
Transportation in Muskingum County, Ohio
Transportation in Coshocton County, Ohio
Transportation in Holmes County, Ohio
Transportation in Ashland County, Ohio
Transportation in Huron County, Ohio
Transportation in Erie County, Ohio